Mok Ying-fan (born 15 January 1951, Hong Kong) is the member of the Wong Tai Sin District Council (1985–91, 1994–2015) representing Tung Mei. He was the also member of the Urban Council (1989–99) and the member of Legislative Council (1995–97) representing for Urban Council constituency. He joined the Provisional Legislative Council which existed from 1996 to 98 with other members of the Association for Democracy and People's Livelihood, while other pro-democrats boycotted it.

References

1951 births
Living people
Members of the Provisional Legislative Council
Members of the Urban Council of Hong Kong
District councillors of Wong Tai Sin District
Hong Kong Association for Democracy and People's Livelihood politicians
HK LegCo Members 1995–1997
Members of the Selection Committee of Hong Kong